The Gray's monitor (Varanus olivaceus) is a large (180 cm, >9 kg) monitor lizard known only from lowland dipterocarp forest in southern Luzon, Catanduanes, and Polillo Island, all islands in the Philippines. It is also known as Gray's monitor lizard, butaan, and ornate monitor. It belongs to the subgenus Philippinosaurus. It is largely arboreal and extremely shy. The Northern Sierra Madre monitor lizard was thought to be of same species with Gray's monitor until a research concluded in 2010 that northern populations of Gray's monitor was a distinct species, now known as V. bitatawa.

Ecology

Diet

It is well known for its diet, which consists primarily of ripe fruit, especially Pandanus.  A number of prey items are, however, also consumed, including snails, crabs, spiders, beetles, birds and eggs.  Monitors are generally carnivorous animals, which makes the Gray's monitor somewhat of an exception amongst the varanid family.  Such an unusual diet may be as a result of competition over food with the water monitors, which share their range.  One of the only fruits readily eaten by this species in captivity is grapes, with these and fruit powder supplementing a captive diet of insects and rodents.

Reproduction
Details of the breeding habits of this species, certainly in the wild, are very limited due to the secretive nature of this species.  The optimum egg-laying time for this species is known to be between July and October, when a clutch of up to 11 eggs will be laid.  Rather than digging a nest, the most likely place for this species to lay eggs is thought to be in tree hollows, where they also spend much of their days resting.  Young are often observed at their smallest in May to July, and as such estimates of incubation time lay at around 300 days.  In captivity, however, incubation has been recorded over 219 days.

Conservation

Threats
It is classed as vulnerable by the IUCN because most of its habitat has been destroyed over the last 60 years, and it is now thought to live in an area as small as 20,000 km2, of which only around 2,000 km2 are occupied by this species. It is thought that habitat destruction is not the only cause for the decreasing population trend, but that they are also still hunted for food and collected for the pet trade. It may be more threatened than initially estimated, since the northern population were confirmed to be of different species (V. bitatawa) in 2010. The range of the species has now been enclosed to the Polillo islands and the southern portions of Luzon, a very fragmented area with sparse rainforests left. A new assessment by the IUCN is highly recommended, as the species may be endangered or critically endangered already.

In captivity
This species is not widely kept in captivity, which is possibly partly because it is not generally bred successfully outside of the Philippines.  This species is on display at the following zoos outside the Philippines:

 Los Angeles Zoo
 Oklahoma City Zoo and Botanical Garden
 Protvin Krokozoo 
 Wingham Wildlife Park
Brookfield Zoo
San Diego Zoo
Bronx Zoo
Fresno Chaffee Zoo

There are two Philippine zoos which are successfully breeding this species, which are Avilon Zoo and Paradise Reptile Zoo. For many years, the only report of a breeding outside of the Philippines was a single baby hatched at the Dallas Zoo in 1994, until the LA Zoo hatched them for the first time in 2015. Dallas gave their two female monitors to the Oklahoma City Zoo in May 2013.

References

Bibliography
 Auffenberg, W. 1988. Gray's Monitor Lizard. University of Florida Press, Gainesville

External links
 The Butaan Project
 The Butaan Project – Background and History
 Butaan:The Lost Dragon 
 Wingham Wildlife Park: Species Information
 Giant Frugivorous Monitor Lizards in the Philippines

Varanus
Reptiles of the Philippines
Endemic fauna of the Philippines
Fauna of Luzon
Fauna of Catanduanes
Reptiles described in 1856
Taxa named by Edward Hallowell (herpetologist)